Max Hoffman House is a Frank Lloyd Wright designed waterfront home in Rye, New York built in 1955 for European automobile importer Max Hoffman.

History 
Hoffman had commissioned Wright to design the Hoffman Auto Showroom for his Jaguar dealership at 430 Park Avenue in New York City in 1954. The following year, Wright designed a large single-story L-shaped home and garden for the Hoffmans on the shore of North Manursing Island overlooking Long Island Sound. 

The Max Hoffman House was later owned by Emily Fisher Landeau and Alice and Thomas Tisch. In 2019, Marc Jacobs acquired the home for $9.18 million.

Design 
Constructed of stone, plaster, and slate roof, with a copper-trimmed fascia, the  single-story home sits on a 1.97-acre lot and features a Japanese-style garden designed by Stephen Morrell, curator of the John P. Humes Japanese Stroll Garden in Locust Valley, New York. In 1972 Taliesin Associated Architects built an additional wing to the north. An interior renovation in 1995 was designed by architect Emanuela Frattini Magnusson.

Ownership history
 1955-1972  Built and expanded for Hoffman
 1972-1993  Purchased by Emily Fisher Landau
 1993–2019  Purchased by Tom & Alice Tisch (son and daughter-in-law of former CBS president and CEO Laurence Tisch)
 2019–pres. Purchased by Marc Jacobs

References
 Storrer, William Allin. The Frank Lloyd Wright Companion. University Of Chicago Press, 2006,  (S.390)

External links
 
 Photo on Arcaid

Frank Lloyd Wright buildings
Modernist architecture in New York (state)
Houses in Westchester County, New York
Buildings and structures in Rye, New York